Giovanni Sansone (24 May 1888 – 13 October 1979) was an Italian mathematician, known for his works on mathematical analysis, on the theory of orthogonal functions and on the theory of ordinary differential equations.

He was an Invited Speaker of the ICM in Bologna in 1928.

Selected publications
.
.
.
, translated in English as 
.

Notes

References

. Includes a list of publications.
  SANSONE, Giovanni, Enciclopedia Italiana - II Appendice (1949)

External links

1888 births
1979 deaths
People from Porto Empedocle
Mathematicians from Sicily
Mathematical analysts
Presidents of the Italian Mathematical Union